JJ Jegede (born 3 October 1985) is a British track and field athlete who specialises in the long jump. He finished fourth in the long jump at the 2012 European Athletics Championships, just seven centimetres off a medal.

He works as a personal trainer and as mentor for young people.

He was not selected for the British team for the 2012 Olympics, as he did not have the "A" standard of 8.20m. He competed at the Glasgow 2014 Commonwealth Games and European Championships in Zurich, making the final in both.

Early life 
Jegede grew up in Hackney as the youngest of four children. He had a rough upbringing, going through a number of evictions when his mother was not able to pay rent. He attended Barking Abbey School. He wanted to become a professional footballer and was offered trials at Norwich and Tottenham Hotspur, but at the beginning of secondary school he was diagnosed with Osgood–Schlatter disease, which stopped him from playing.

Promotional work 
In 2011, Jegede jumped over three Mini Coopers as part of an advertising campaign for the Mini London 2012 edition models. He is involved in the Metropolitan Police's Met Track scheme, as well as Sky's Living For Sport campaign. As part of this, he has done numerous school visits.

Statistics

Personal bests

References

External links

JJ Jegede jumping over 3 Mini Coopers

1985 births
Living people
Athletes from London
British male long jumpers
English male long jumpers
Commonwealth Games competitors for England
Athletes (track and field) at the 2014 Commonwealth Games
British Athletics Championships winners